The Geographical Centre of Ireland, according to an investigation and calculation carried out by the Official Irish Government  Mapping Agency, Ordnance Survey Ireland (OSI) published on the official OSI website on 24 February 2022  is near the village of Castletown Geoghegan, County Westmeath.

The exact location lies at the Irish Transverse Mercator (ITM) coordinates 633015.166477, 744493.046768,  and at Latitude: 53.4494762 and Longitude : -7.5029786.

[ Reference : Ordnance Survey Ireland website Blog : https://osi.ie/blog/where-is-the-centre-of-ireland/].

It sits in the townland  of Adamstown within a National Monuments Zone, on the location of an ancient graveyard and near the remains of Kilbride church.

This investigation to identify the exact geographic centre of Ireland assumed a calculation that would take in the whole of the mainland Island of Ireland but exclude the islands of which there are approximately 8,000 mapped islands, outcrops etc.

It is however based on current data and based on current coastal data and any coastal erosion or accretion historically or in the future would change the data and change the exact location calculated . 
 
Various locations have claimed in the past to be the geographical centre of Ireland using various methodologies ( though sometimes without any updated references or supporting academic methodology ) .

OSI have determined that the most appropriate methodology to use currently is the one  published in February 2022 and which determined the location to be just outside Castletown Geoghegan.

In Irish mythology the  Hill of Uisneach, which is about 17.7 kilometres west of Mullingar and two kilometres from the village of Loughanavally was generally considered to be the ceremonial and ancient spiritual centre of Ireland, though at times the Hill of Tara was also regarded in a similar manner.

The Hill of Uisneach is the nearest of the alternative historical locations to the location calculated by the OSI  and is approximately  5 kilometres south east  in a direct line from the Hill of Uisneach.

References
 Ordnance Survey Ireland website Blog : https://osi.ie/blog/where-is-the-centre-of-ireland/ 24 February 2022

Geography of Ireland
Ireland